WGRW (90.7 FM) is a non-commercial radio station licensed to serve Anniston, Alabama, United States.  The station is owned by Word Works, Inc.

Programming
WGRW broadcasts a Contemporary Christian music format to the Anniston and Gadsden, Alabama, area. The station derives a portion of its programming from the Moody Broadcasting Network and the Salem Radio Network.

Jon Holder, station manager and host of Grace in the Morning, has been with WGRW since it launched in 1999. Holder had previously worked at WDNG, also in Anniston.

History
This station's original construction permit was granted by the Federal Communications Commission on September 12, 1996.  The new station was assigned the WGRW call letters by the FCC on October 25, 1996. On June 25, 1999, WGRW received its license to cover from the FCC.

References

External links
 
 
 

Contemporary Christian radio stations in the United States
Radio stations established in 1999
Mass media in Calhoun County, Alabama
Moody Radio affiliate stations
1999 establishments in Alabama
GRW